Ksenija Jastsenjski (born 2 September 1982 in Belgrade) is a Serbian figure skater. She is a seven-time national champion. She formerly represented Serbia and Montenegro and FR Yugoslavia.

Competitive highlights

Post-2001

 WD = Withdrawn

Pre-2001

J = Junior level; QR = Qualifying Round

References

 

Serbian female single skaters
Yugoslav female single skaters
Figure skaters at the 2007 Winter Universiade
Sportspeople from Belgrade
1982 births
Living people
Competitors at the 2005 Winter Universiade